WTRC may refer to:

WTRC (AM) 1340 AM, licensed to Elkhart, Indiana
WTRC-FM 95.3 FM, licensed to Niles, Michigan
WFED 1500 AM, licensed to Washington, D.C., which held the WTRC call letters from 1926 until 1927